College of the Immaculate Conception may refer to:

College of the Immaculate Conception (Cabanatuan City), Nueva Ecija, Philippines
College of the Immaculate Conception (New Orleans), New Orleans, Louisiana
Saint Mary's College, Trinidad and Tobago, Trinidad and Tobago
College of the Immaculate Conception (Enugu), Enugu, Nigeria
College of the Immaculate Conception (Sligo), Sligo, Ireland